Sir Frederick Eley, 1st Baronet (22 November 1866 – 7 February 1951) was an English banker.

Eley was born in Shrewsbury and educated at Shrewsbury School. He joined the National Provincial Bank and rose to the post of general manager with a seat on the board of directors. He was also chairman of John Waddington Ltd, Cope & Timmins, Crosse & Blackwell Ltd (1932–1946), the Waldorf Hotel Company, and the Bank of British West Africa (1942–1948). He was chairman of the Chelsea Hospital for Women and was a prominent racehorse owner.

Announced in the 1921 New Year Honours, he was created a baronet of Sagamore in the parish of Shiplake in the County of Oxford on 14 January 1921.

Eley died on 7 February 1951, aged eighty-four.  His cremated ashes were buried at Stoke Poges, Buckinghamshire.

Footnotes

References
Obituary, The Times, 8 February 1951

1866 births
1951 deaths
Businesspeople from Shrewsbury
People from Shiplake
People educated at Shrewsbury School
English bankers
Baronets in the Baronetage of the United Kingdom